Saima Noor is a Pakistani actress who has appeared in Punjabi and Urdu films and Pakistani dramas. After making her film debut with Griban in 1987, she appeared in a wide range of successful Punjabi films, mostly in which she was starred opposite action hero Sultan Rahi. She rose to prominence when director Syed Noor introduced her in Urdu feature films, and became one of the leading and highest-paid actresses of Pakistani cinema after starring in the mainstream Punjabi-language film Choorian, which ranks among the highest grossing Pakistani films of all time. Choorian also holds the record to be one of the longest running Pakistani films showcased at a single screen cinema where it ran for five years. In the same year, Saima agreed to work in female centric action film Daku Rani which opened to mixed reviews. In 2000, she acted in the successful horror film Billi, also directed by Noor. Saima was praised for playing double roles of a fearless girl and her mother in adventure film Jungle Queen. After many successful films, her career was disturbed after the decline of Lollywood in early 2000s. However, she shot to fame again due to her performance in blockbuster film Majajan and reprise the same character in the film's sequel Zill-e-Shah. Her film Majajan ran for five years in cinemas. During the shooting of Majajan, director Syed Noor married her but kept it a secret until Saima publicly revealed in a 2007's press conference that the couple married in 2005. In 2012, she starred in another film with Noor, titled Shareeka which generated negative reviews and turned out to be a disaster.

In 2016, her successful drama film Zill-e-Shah was re-released at the Metropole Cinema in Lahore. She also portrayed a pivotal role in biographical film Salute which flopped at the box-office. In her career spanning more than thirty years, she has constantly worked with director Masud Butt. 

As of 2017, she is set to appear opposite Moammar Rana in her husband Syed Noor's much delayed film Bhai Wanted.

Saima has acted in over 300 movies. Some of her notable movies are listed below:

Film

References

External links
 

Noor, Saima